Guillaume d'Andlau, (born in 1962, Normandy, France), is the owner of the castle of Andlau and the president of the Association for the fortified castles of Alsace.

Biography

Family 
He came from an old Alsatian aristocratic family, descendant of a hero of the American Revolution Victor de Broglie (1756-1794), the president of the council Victor de Broglie (1785-1870), the philosopher Claude-Adrien Helvetius, the historian Joseph d'Haussonville and the monarchist deputy Paul-Gabriel d'Haussonville.

Son of the Count Charles-Antoine d'Andlau (1922-2019) and Nicole Marie Odette Thierry d'Argenlieu (1928-2011), he is also a distant cousin of Christian d'Andlau-Hombourg, president of the Alsatian section of the International Paneuropean Union and Grand Prior of France of the Order of Saint Lazarus (statuted 1910) and has three daughters with Rosamée Armand Laroche: Douce, Apolline and Flore.

Career 
He headed the Economic and Social Council of Alsace then in 2016, ran in the legislative elections.

In 2019, he took over the management of the European Center of Deported Resistance Members—Struthof (in French, or CERD Struthof), dependent on the National Office for Combatants and War Victims created by Jacques Chirac in 2005,

In 2022, he oversaw the renovations of the museum located at the site of the Natzweiler-Struthof concentration camp, the only concentration camp established in France by the Nazis.

Rewards 
 Prize patrimony 2017 for Le chemin des châteaux forts d'Alsace

Books 
Les fêtes retrouvées : fêtes et traditions populaires Belgique, France, Luxembourg, Suisse, 1997
Fêtes chrétiennes, 2006
Sacrements, 2006
L'Action humanitaire, Que sais-je ?, 2015

Notes

1962 births
Living people
Directors of museums in France
People from Normandy
Sciences Po alumni
Alumni of the School of Advanced Study